Central ward is a ward in the metropolitan borough of Barnsley, South Yorkshire, England.  The ward contains 48 listed buildings that are recorded in the National Heritage List for England.  Of these, three are listed at Grade II*, the middle of the three grades, and the others are at Grade II, the lowest grade.  The ward is in the central part of the town of Barnsley, a market town until the coming of the Industrial Revolution.  Its main industry was wire-drawing, and it later became the centre of English linen weaving.  However, later developments in the town has led to the destruction of many of its older buildings.

Most of the listed buildings in the ward are houses and associated structures, shops and offices.  The other listed buildings include churches and chapels, public houses and hotels, former industrial buildings, banks, public buildings, cemetery buildings, a war memorial, and two telephone kiosks.


Key

Buildings

See also 

 Listed buildings in Barnsley

References

Citations

Sources

 

Lists of listed buildings in South Yorkshire
Listed